The 1990–91 season was the 91st season in the existence of S.S. Lazio and the club's third consecutive season in the top flight of Italian football. In addition to the domestic league, Lazio participated in this season's edition of the Coppa Italia.

Players

First-team squad

Transfers

Autumn

Competitions

Overall record

Serie A

League table

Results summary

Results by round

Matches

Coppa Italia

Second round

Statistics

Players statistics

References

S.S. Lazio seasons
Lazio